Batu Uban is a state constituency in Penang, Malaysia, that has been represented in the Penang State Legislative Assembly since 1986. It covers a portion of Penang Island's eastern seaboard, including the southernmost suburbs of George Town.

The state constituency was first contested in 1986 and is mandated to return a single Assemblyman to the Penang State Legislative Assembly under the first-past-the-post voting system. , the State Assemblyman for Batu Uban is Kumaresan Aramugam from Parti Keadilan Rakyat (PKR), which is part of the state's ruling coalition, Pakatan Harapan (PH).

Definition

Polling districts 
According to the federal gazette issued on 30 March 2018, the Batu Uban constituency is divided into 8 polling districts.

It encompasses the southernmost halve of Gelugor, a suburb of George Town, including Universiti Sains Malaysia and Minden Heights. Surrounding neighbourhoods such as Batu Uban, Sungai Dua, Sungai Nibong and Bukit Jambul are also situated within this state seat.

The northern limits of this constituency roughly follows the course of the Gelugor River into the sea, thereby dividing Gelugor into the northern and southern halves (with the northern half under the neighbouring Seri Delima constituency). The Batu Uban seat is also bounded to the south by Jalan Tun Dr Awang, Jalan Sultan Azlan Shah and Sungai Dua.

Demographics

History

Election results 
The electoral results for the Batu Uban state constituency in 2008, 2013 and 2018 are as follows.

See also 
 Constituencies of Penang

References 

Penang state constituencies